Doug Brinham (25 February 1934 – 28 September 2020) was a Canadian basketball player. He competed in the men's tournament at the 1956 Summer Olympics.

References

External links
 

1934 births
2020 deaths
Basketball people from British Columbia
Canadian men's basketball players
1959 FIBA World Championship players
Olympic basketball players of Canada
Basketball players at the 1956 Summer Olympics
Basketball players from Vancouver